Flowing Springs is a census-designated place in Gila County in the U.S. state of Arizona.  Flowing Springs is located approximately eight miles north of the town of Payson. The population was 34 at the 2020 census, down from 42 at the 2010 census.

Geography

Demographics

References

Census-designated places in Gila County, Arizona